Qarasuqumlaq (also, Qarasugumlag, Karasukumlak and Karasu-Kumlakh) is a village and municipality in the Agdash Rayon of Azerbaijan.  It has a population of 652.

References 

Populated places in Agdash District